Fiona Jenkins (born 1965) is an Australian philosopher and Associate Professor of Philosophy at the Australian National University.
She is known for her works on feminist theory, the status of women in philosophy and Nietzschean philosophy.
Jenkins was the convenor of the ANU Gender Institute from 2012 to 2015.

Books
 Women in Philosophy: What Needs to Change?, Fiona Jenkins and Katrina Hutchison (eds), Oxford University Press, 2013
 Allegiance and Identity in a Globalised World, Fiona Jenkins, Mark Nolan and Kim Rubenstein (eds), Cambridge University Press, 2014

See also
4 Months, 3 Weeks and 2 Days
Margaret Jolly
Jennifer Saul

References

External links
Fiona Jenkins at the ANU
Dr Fiona Jenkins @ NECTAR’s ANU Early Career Academic Retreat 2015
Fiona Jenkins, Google Scholar
Associate Professor Fiona Jenkins
A deathly conversation, Samuel Baron's talk with Fiona Jenkins, The Philosopher's Zone, 2 April 2017

Australian philosophers
Continental philosophers
Political philosophers
Philosophy academics
Living people
Academic staff of the Australian National University
Alumni of the University of Sussex
Alumni of Balliol College, Oxford
Australian women philosophers
Nietzsche scholars
1965 births